is a Japanese high school located in the Setagaya ward of Tokyo. It is affiliated with the Shoin University. The predecessor of the school, a women's school, was founded in 1941. It was chartered as a Junior and Senior High School in 1947, and become coeducational in 2005.

History
1941: Shoin Women's School was established.
1947: Shoin Junior High School was chartered by the Ministry of Education (now, Ministry of Education, Culture, Sports, Science and Technology).
1948: Shoin High School was chartered by the Ministry of Education.
1948: Shoin Kindergarten (coeducational) was chartered by the Ministry of Education.
2005: Shoin Junior and High School became coeducational.
2008: Foreign language education program was introduced.

Notable alumni
Tomomi Kahala, singer
Yumi Maruyama, former volleyball player

References

External links

 Shoin Junior and Senior High School official website 
 Shoin University official website 

Junior high schools in Japan
Educational institutions established in 1941
High schools in Tokyo
Shoin University
1941 establishments in Japan